No Elephants is the ninth release by musician Lisa Germano. It was released in 2013 through Badman Recording Co.

Track listing
All tracks composed by Lisa Germano
Ruminants
No Elephants
Apathy and the Devil
Back to Earth
Haunted
A Feast
Up in the Air
Dance of the Bees
Diamonds
...And So On
Last Straws for Sale
Strange Bird

References

Lisa Germano albums
2013 albums
Badman Recording Co. albums